Parascolopsis melanophrys, commonly known as dwarf monocle bream, is a fish found in West Timor, Indonesia and Sabah, Malaysia in the Western Central Pacific, as well as in the Philippines.

References

Fish of the Pacific Ocean
Taxa named by Barry C. Russell
Taxa named by Chin Phui-Kong
Fish described in 1996
Nemipteridae